Prempeh II (Otumfuo Nana Sir Osei Tutu Agyeman Prempeh II, KBE,  – 27 May 1970), was the 14th Asantehene, or king of the Ashanti (Ruler of the Asante), reigning from 22 June 1931 to 27 May 1970.

Biography 
Asantehene Prempeh II of the Ashanti was born in 1892 in the capital Kumasi. He was four years old when his uncle, Prempeh I (the 13th Asantehene), his maternal grandmother, queen Nana Yaa Akyaa, and other family members were captured and exiled to the Seychelles Islands by the British in 1896. Prempeh I returned from exile in 1924 and died in May 1931, and Otumfuo Prempeh II was subsequently elected as his successor; however, he was elected as merely Kumasihene rather than Asantehene. In 1935, after strenuous efforts on his part, the colonial authorities allowed Prempeh II to assume the title of Asantehene.

In 1949 Prempeh II was instrumental in founding Prempeh College, a prestigious all-boys boarding school in Kumasi, Ashanti. He also gave a large tract of land for the construction of the Kwame Nkrumah University of Science and Technology (KNUST), which in 1969 awarded him an honorary degree of Doctor of Science. In October 1969 he was elected as the first President of the National House of Chiefs, and shortly thereafter was appointed to the Council of State.

See also
Ashanti people
Rulers of the Ashanti

References

External link
Kingdom of Ashanti Kings And Queens Of Asante

1890s births
Year of birth uncertain
1970 deaths
Ashanti monarchs
Knights Commander of the Order of the British Empire
People from Kumasi
Ghanaian leaders
Ghanaian Freemasons
Ghanaian royalty
Ashanti royalty